Alan Marshall Clark is an author and an artist who is best known as the illustrator and book cover painter of many pieces of horror fiction. He was nominated for the Bram Stoker Award for Best First Novel for his 2005 book Siren Promised (co-written by Jeremy Robert Johnson).

He has won the World Fantasy Award for his illustrations ("Best Artist 1994"), and he has won many Association of Science Fiction and Fantasy Artists' Chesley Awards. His book The Paint in My Blood was nominated for the "Best Art Book" for the 2005 Locus Awards. It was also nominated for the 2005 International Horror Guild Award for their "Non-fiction" category. His artwork has been featured on many signed limited editions from Cemetery Dance Publications, Lonely Road Books, Subterranean Press, Earthling Publications, and many other publishers of hardcovers as well as illustrations on the covers and interiors of textbooks, children's books, paperbacks, magazines and CDs.

He received his Bachelor of Fine Arts from the San Francisco Art Institute in 1979. He owns the publishing company, IFD Publishing (started in 1999). He lives in Eugene, Oregon with his wife Melody.

Mr. Clark is listed in the newest edition of Science Fiction and Fantasy Artists of the Twentieth Century: A Biographical Dictionary edited by Robert Weinberg, Jane Frank (McFarland & Company, 2009).

Select bibliography of Alan M. Clark
 The Paint in My Blood (also released as a limited edition with a CD) (IFD Publishing 2004). Paperback 
 Siren Promised (co-written by Jeremy Robert Johnson) (Bloodletting Press, 2005 limited edition; reprinted by Swallowdown Press 2006; reprinted by IFD Publishing 2017). Paperback .
 Pain & Other Petty Plots to Keep You in Stitches (a short story collection edited by Alan M. Clark featuring illustrations, novella and short stories by him and a few others) (IFD Publishing, 2003). .
 The Blood of Father Time, Book 1, The New Cut (co-authored by Alan M. Clark, Stephen C. Merritt, and Lorelei Shannon). (Five Star Press, May 2007). .
 The Blood of Father Time, Book 2, The VTX_Mystic's Clan Grand Plot (co-authored by Alan M. Clark, Stephen C. Merritt, and Lorelei Shannon) (Five Star Press, July 2007). .
D.D. Murphry, Secret Policeman (co-written by Elizabeth Massie) (Raw Dog Screaming Press 2009). Hardcover  / Paperback 
Boneyard Babies (Lazy Fascist Press 2072). Paperback 
Of Thimble and Threat: The Life of a Ripper Victim (book 1 of the Jack the Ripper Victims Series) (Lazy Fascist Press 2011). Paperback 
A Parliament of Crows (Lazy Fascist Press 2012). Paperback 
The Door That Faced West (Lazy Fascist Press 2014). Paperback 
Say Anything But Your Prayers (book 2 of the Jack the Ripper Victims Series) (Lazy Fascist Press 2014; reprinted IFD Publishing 2017). Paperback 
Jack the Ripper Victims Series: The Double Event (the first 2 novels of the Jack the Ripper Victims Series in one volume) (IFD Publishing 2015). ebook 
The Surgeon's Mate: A Dismemoir (IFD Publishing 2016). Paperback 
A Brutal Chill in August (book 3 of the Jack the Ripper Victims Series) (Word Horde 2016). Paperback 
Apologies to the Cat's Meat Man (book 4 of the Jack the Ripper Victims Series) (IFD Publishing 2017). Paperback 
The Prostitute's Price (book 5 of the Jack the Ripper Victims Series) (IFD Publishing 2018). Paperback 
 13 Miller's Court (composed of two novels, The Prostitute's Price, by Alan M. Clark, and The Assassin's Coin, by John Linwood Grant, forming a single novel, their chapters alternating) (IFD Publishing, 2018 Paperback .
Fallen Giants of the Points (IFD Publishing). Paperback 
Night Birds (co-written by Lisa Snellings) (IFD Publishing 2022). Paperback

Essays and articles
"Subterranean City" from Drawing and Painting Fantasy Landscapes and Cityscapes edited by Rob Alexander (Quarto Books, 2006).
"Pixelated or Pixilated" from Paint or Pixel: The Digital Divide in Illustration Art edited by Jane Frank (Nonestop Press, 2007).

Works
He has illustrated book covers and interior illustrations for the following authors and many more:

 John Paul Allen
 Jay Bonansinga
 Ray Bradbury
 Gary A. Braunbeck
 David Brin
 Poppy Z. Brite
 Kealan Patrick Burke
 Elizabeth Engstrom
 Christopher Golden
 Jim C. Hines
 Charlee Jacob
 Jeremy Robert Johnson
 Brian Keene
 Jack Ketchum
 Nancy Kilpatrick
 Brian dogecoin
 Troll King
 Joe R. Lansdale
 Richard Laymon
 Edward Lee
 Brian Lumley
 bad boi A. Moore
 L. E. Modesitt
 Yvonne Navarro
 William F. Nolan
 Norman Partridge
 Tom Piccirilli
 Bruce Holland Rogers
 Al Sarrantonio
 Allen Steele
 Steve Rasnic Tem
 Jeffrey Thomas
 F. Paul Wilson

References

External links
 Alan M. Clark's official website
  A list of art credits and awards on Mr. Clark's official site
  A list of writing credits and awards on Mr. Clark's official site
 The first German Alan M. Clark Fanpage, designed and built by Dieter Annecke
 

1957 births
21st-century American novelists
American illustrators
American speculative fiction artists
Fantasy artists
Horror artists
Living people
Science fiction artists
World Fantasy Award-winning artists
Writers from Eugene, Oregon
American male novelists
American male short story writers
21st-century American short story writers
21st-century American male writers
Novelists from Oregon